Washington Township is a township in Vernon County, in the U.S. state of Missouri.

Washington Township most likely was named in honor of President George Washington.

References

Townships in Missouri
Townships in Vernon County, Missouri